Shekhar Ravjiani is an Indian singer, music director, record producer and actor, who has been one half of the Bollywood composing/producing duo Vishal–Shekhar, since 1999.

Personal life
Ravjiani was born in a Kutchi family. He lives in South Mumbai with his wife Chhaya and daughter Bipasha.

Career
Ravjiani started his career by advertising. He auditioned for Sa Re Ga Ma Pa and was selected. Then he became a part of the duo Vishal–Shekhar. The duo produced many Bollywood songs, and they were judges at Sa Re Ga Ma Pa in 2007 and 2010. Ravjiani has sung the hit tracks "Tujhe Bhula Diya", "Bin Tere" and "Meherbaan".

Filmography

Music Director (Vishal and Shekhar)

 Pathaan (2023)
 Vikram Vedha (2022)
 Jayeshbhai Jordaar  (2022)
 Bob Biswas (2021)
Chehre (2021)
Baaghi 3 (2020)
War (2019)
 Bharat (2019)
 Student of the Year 2 (2019)
 Naa Peru Surya (2018)
 Tiger Zinda Hai (2017)
 Befikre (2016)
Banjo (2016)
Akira (2016)
 Sultan (2016)
 Fan (2016)
 Happy New Year (2014)
 Bang Bang! (2014)
 Hasee Toh Phasee (2014)
 Gori Tere Pyaar Mein (2013)
 Chennai Express (2013)
 Balak Palak(Marathi) (2013)
 Student of the Year (2012)
 Shanghai (2012)
 Kahaani (2012)
 Arjun – The Warrior Prince (2012)
 The Dirty Picture (2011)
 Ra.One (2011)
 Rascals (2011)
 Bbuddah... Hoga Terra Baap (2011)
 Tees Maar Khan (2010)
 Break Ke Baad (2010)
 Anjaana Anjaani (2010)
 I Hate Luv Storys (2010)
 Aladin (2009)
 Dostana (2008)
 Bachna Ae Haseeno (2008)
 Chintakayala Ravi (2008) (Telugu)
 Tashan (2008)
 De Taali (2008)
 Bhoothnath (2008)
 Om Shanti Om (2007)
 Cash (2007)
 Ta Ra Rum Pum (2007)
 Honeymoon Travels Pvt. Ltd. (2007)
 I See You (2006)
 Golmaal (2006)
 Tathastu (2006)
 Taxi Number 9211 (2006)
 Zinda (2006)
 Bluffmaster (2005)
 Ek Ajnabee (2005)
 Salaam Namaste (2005)
 Dus (2005)
 Karam (2005)
 Home Delivery: Aapko... Ghar Tak (2005)
 Shabd (2005)
 Musafir (2004)
 Shukriya (2004)
 Popcorn Khao! Mast Ho Jao (2004)
 Shaadi Ka Laddoo (2004)
 Plan (2004)
 Waisa Bhi Hota Hai Part II (2003)
 Jhankaar Beats (2003)
 Supari (2003)
 Kaante (2002)
 Pyaar Mein Kabhi Kabhi (1999)

As singer

As a Lyricist
 Anjaana Anjaani (2010) - "Aas Pas Khuda", "Aas Pas Khuda (Reprise)" (Along with Vishal Dadlani)
 Ra one (2011) - "Chamak Chalo", "Chamak Chalo (International)" (Along with Vishal Dadlani, Niranjan Iyengar)

Awards and nominations 

Following is the list of awards and nominations received by Shekhar Ravjiani alone. List of awards and nominations received by Vishal–Shekhar can be seen here.

Mirchi Music Awards

Filmfare Awards

Stardust Awards

Television

Interviews 
Interview with Shekhar Ravjiani by HKYantoYan.com

SHEKHAR RAVJIANI | INTERVIEW | AVSTV

References

Indian film score composers
Bollywood playback singers
Indian male playback singers
Living people
Year of birth missing (living people)
Kutchi people
Singers from Mumbai
People from Bhuj
Indian male pop singers
Indian folk-pop singers
21st-century Indian composers
21st-century Indian singers
Indian male film score composers
21st-century Indian male singers